Linda Yi-Chuang Yueh  is a British/American economist, broadcaster, and author, born in Taiwan and of dual British and American citizenship. Yueh is an adjunct professor of economics at London Business School, and a Fellow in Economics at St Edmund Hall, Oxford University. She was also a Visiting Professor at Peking University and associated with both the Centre for Economic Performance and IDEAS research centres at the London School of Economics (LSE). She is a TV and radio presenter, including for BBC programmes such as Radio 4 Analysis, Business Daily on BBC World Service, and Radio 4 Today programme. From 2013 to 2015, she was Chief Business Correspondent and a Contributing Editor for BBC News when she hosted Talking Business with Linda Yueh, as well as former Economics Editor at Bloomberg Television.

Background
Yueh was born in Taipei and emigrated to the United States around 1982 when she was five years old. She has a BA from Yale University, a Master of Public Policy from Harvard University, a JD from New York University School of Law and a D.Phil. in economics and MA from St Edmund Hall, Oxford.

Career
Yueh has been a corporate lawyer at Paul, Weiss, Rifkind, Wharton & Garrison resident in New York City, Beijing, and Hong Kong.

Yueh was previously a non-executive director of two FTSE-listed companies, a board member of London & Partners, the official promotion agency of London, and an adviser to the British Chambers of Commerce (BCC). Yueh is currently a non-executive director at Rentokil Initial; she has held this role since November 2017.

Yueh is an External Trustee of the Coutts Foundation and also on the advisory board of OMFIF. She serves on the supervisory Policy Committee of the Centre for Economic Performance (CEP) at the London School of Economics (LSE). She is also the Chair of the Royal Commonwealth Society and Malaria No More UK.

In September 2020, Yueh was named an advisor to the British Board of Trade.

She was appointed Commander of the Order of the British Empire (CBE) in the 2023 New Year Honours for services to economics.

International activities
Yueh has been a consultant to the World Bank, the European Commission, the Asian Development Bank, and the World Economic Forum at Davos.

Academia
Yueh has had several dozen scholarly articles published while teaching at Oxford University, London Business School, London School of Economics and Political Science and Peking University where she holds a visiting professorship in economics.

Books
 The Great Economists: How Their Ideas Can Help Us Today. Viking. /What Would the Great Economists Do? How Twelve Brilliant Minds Would Solve Today's Biggest Problems. Picador.
 China's Growth: The Making of an Economic Superpower. Oxford University Press.
 The Economy of China. Edward Elgar Publishing.
 China and Globalisation: Critical Concepts in Globalisation. Routledge. (editor).
 Enterprising China: Business, Economic, and Legal Developments since 1979. Oxford University Press.
 The Law and Economics of Globalisation. Edward Elgar Publishing. (editor).
 Macroeconomics. Cengage Learning. (co-author).
 The Future of Asian Trade and Growth: Economic Development with the Emergence of China. Routledge. (editor).
 Globalisation and Economic Growth in China. Routledge. (co-editor).

References

External links
 
 LSE profile

1977 births
Living people
20th-century Taiwanese women
Alumni of St Edmund Hall, Oxford
Yale University alumni
New York University School of Law alumni
Harvard Kennedy School alumni
20th-century British writers
21st-century British writers
21st-century American non-fiction writers
20th-century American writers
21st-century American economists
American journalists of Chinese descent
Taiwanese emigrants to the United States
Taiwanese emigrants to the United Kingdom
BBC newsreaders and journalists
British journalists
British women journalists
British economists
British women economists
Fellows of St Edmund Hall, Oxford
Academics of the London School of Economics
Paul, Weiss, Rifkind, Wharton & Garrison people
American women radio presenters
British women radio presenters
American women journalists of Asian descent
20th-century American women
American women academics
21st-century American women writers
Taiwanese radio presenters
Taiwanese women radio presenters
Naturalised citizens of the United Kingdom
Commanders of the Order of the British Empire